This is a list of films produced and/or distributed by Focus Features, the arthouse motion picture production/distribution arm of NBCUniversal, a division of Comcast.

Universal Focus

2000s

2010s

2020s

Upcoming

Undated films

References

External links 
 Focus Features website

Focus
Focus